The 2001 New Jersey gubernatorial election was a race for the Governor of New Jersey. It was held on November 6, 2001. Primaries took place on June 25. Democratic nominee Jim McGreevey won the general election with 56% of the vote — the first majority-elected governor since James Florio in 1989. His Republican opponent in that race was Bret Schundler. This is also the most recent statewide election in which the Democrat won Monmouth and Ocean Counties.

McGreevey resigned in November 2004 after admitting that he was a gay man and ethical issues surrounding his governorship; he was succeeded by Senate President Richard Codey, who filled the remainder of McGreevey's term until January 2006.

Democratic primary

Candidates
Jim McGreevey, Mayor of Woodbridge, former state senator and nominee for governor in 1997
Elliot Greenspan, LaRouche activist

Withdrew 

 Robert Torricelli, U.S. Senator since 1997 (withdrew August 1, 2000)

Results

Republican primary

Candidates
Bob Franks, former U.S. Representative from Summit and nominee for U.S. Senate in 2000
Bret Schundler, Mayor of Jersey City

Withdrew
Donald DiFrancesco, President of the New Jersey Senate and acting Governor

Declined
Jack Collins, Speaker of the New Jersey General Assembly since 1996

Campaign
Towards the end of his tenure as mayor, Schundler served as chairman of the Hudson County Republican Committee, and in 2001, Schundler won the Republican gubernatorial nomination, facing former Congressman Bob Franks, a considerably more moderate Republican who was favored by the party establishment.  Franks entered the race in April, two months before the primary, after Gov. Donald DiFrancesco dropped out of the race because of an unending series of newspaper stories highlighting ethics concerns.  He was backed by Gov. DiFrancesco's political organization and endorsed by every county Republican committee except Schundler's base in Hudson County.

Schundler employed a more grassroots style of campaigning, visiting many local GOP organizations and forming close relationships with the Young Republicans and the College Republicans, as well as with conservative groups, including those active in homeschooling issues.  The grassroots support he built up enabled him to win the nomination by a robust 15-point margin.

Results

General election

Candidates
Jerry Coleman (Green)
Mark Edgerton (Libertarian)
Michael Koontz (Conservative)
James McGreevey (Democratic)
Costantino Rozzo (Socialist)
William E. Schluter (Independent)
Bret Schundler (Republican)
Kari Sachs (Socialist Workers)

Campaign
After winning the primary, Schundler tried to reunite the party by reaching out to the figures who had endorsed Franks.  This included having a unity lunch with Franks which was hosted by former Gov. Thomas Kean, and retaining New Jersey State Senator Joe Kyrillos as state party chairman.  Kyrillos had been appointed by DiFrancesco as state party chairman six weeks before the primary, and he had supported Franks in the primary. However, the party remained split. Jim McGreevey, the Democratic candidate, exploited this division by painting Schundler as too conservative for New Jersey.

Polling

Results

Results by county

Counties that flipped from Republican to Democratic
Atlantic (largest municipality: Egg Harbor Township)
Bergen (largest municipality: Hackensack)
Monmouth (largest municipality: Middletown Township)
Ocean (largest municipality: Lakewood)
Salem (largest municipality: Pennsville Township)

Notes

References

Official campaign websites
 Jim McGreevey (D) for Governor
 Bret Schundler (R) for Governor

2001
New Jersey
Gubernatorial
November 2001 events in the United States